Frank "Magic" Oleynick (born February 20, 1955) is an American retired professional basketball player.

Born in Bridgeport, Connecticut, he played collegiately for Seattle University.

He played for the US national team in the 1974 FIBA World Championship, winning the bronze medal.

He was selected by the Seattle SuperSonics in the 1st round (12th pick overall) of the 1975 NBA Draft.

He played for the Sonics (1975–77) in the NBA for 102 games.

References

External links 
 

1955 births
Living people
1974 FIBA World Championship players
American men's basketball players
Basketball players from Connecticut
Point guards
Seattle Redhawks men's basketball players
Seattle SuperSonics draft picks
Seattle SuperSonics players
Sportspeople from Bridgeport, Connecticut
United States men's national basketball team players